Badrul Alam is a male Muslim given name. 

Badrul Alam or variants may also refer to: 

 Badrul Alam (1929–1980), Bangladeshi physician.
 Badrul Alam, Freedom fighter and former  Squadron Leader of Bangladesh Air Force.

See also 

 Badr ul-Alam Syah (died 1765), twenty-sixth sultan of Aceh in Northern Sumatra.
 Badr ul-Alam Syarif Hasyim Jamaluddin ( 1699–1702),  eighteenth sultan of Aceh in Northern  Sumatra.